Should Have Seen It Coming is the fourth studio album by the American bluegrass band Split Lip Rayfield, released in 2004 (see 2004 in music).



Track listing
All songs written by Kirk Rundstrom except where noted.
 "Hundred Dollar Bill" (Gottstine)  – 2:21
 "Truth & Lies" – 1:47
 "Honestly" – 1:49
 "Redneck Tailgate Dream" (Mardis)  – 3:21
 "Promise Not to Tell" (Gottstine) – 3:08
 "A Little More Cocaine Please" (Gottstine) – 2:17
 "C'mon Get Your Gun" – 1:49
 "Used To Be" – 2:34
 "Lonely Man Blues" – 1:46
 "Don't Believe That You're Someone" (Gottstine) – 2:32
 "Down South Sally" (Gottstine) – 2:29
 "Should Have Seen it Coming" (Gottstine) – 3:02
 "Out of Time" (Gottstine) – 3:49
 "Union Man" – 1:53
 "Lonesome Heart" – 1:55 
 "Just Like A Gillian Welch Song" (Gottstine) – 2:50

Personnel
Jeff Eaton -  Gas Tank Bass, Vocals
Wayne Gottstine    - Mandolin, Vocals
Kirk Rundstrom    -  Guitar, Vocals
Eric Mardis   -  Banjo, Vocals

2004 albums
Split Lip Rayfield albums
Bloodshot Records albums